St Mary's Catholic High School is a coeducational secondary school located in Leyland in the English county of Lancashire.

It is a voluntary aided school administered by Lancashire County Council and the Roman Catholic Archdiocese of Liverpool. Pupils are mostly admitted from St Anne's Catholic Primary School and St Mary's Catholic Primary School in Leyland, St Catherine's Catholic Primary School in Farington, St Mary's Catholic Primary School in Euxton and SS Peter and Pauls’ Catholic Primary School in Mawdesley.

The school was established in 1957. In 1996, the school was awarded specialist status as a Technology College.

On 1 September 2013, the school suffered a devastating fire that destroyed most of the school buildings and caused £15,000,000 damage. Pupils had to travel everyday to a closed school in Ribbleton until Christmas. In September 2015, the new school building was opened to pupils.

St Mary's offers GCSEs, BTECs and Cambridge Nationals as programmes of study for pupils.

References

External links
Leyland St Mary's Catholic High School official website

Arson in the 2010s
Catholic secondary schools in the Archdiocese of Liverpool
Educational institutions established in 1957
Leyland, Lancashire
School buildings in the United Kingdom destroyed by arson
Schools in South Ribble
Secondary schools in Lancashire
1957 establishments in England
Voluntary aided schools in England